Dave Baker (born March 27, 1962) is an American politician serving as a member of the Minnesota House of Representatives since 2015. A member of the Republican Party of Minnesota, Baker represents District 16B in west-central Minnesota, which includes the city of Willmar and parts of Kandiyohi County.

Early life and education
Baker was raised in Hamel, Minnesota. He attended Aitkin High School and the St. Cloud Area Vocational Technical Institute, studying sales and management.

Minnesota House of Representatives
Baker was elected to the Minnesota House of Representatives in 2014 and has been reelected every two years since. He defeated one-term DFL incumbent Mary Sawatsky. 

Baker is the minority lead on the Workforce Development Finance and Policy Committee and sits on the Human Services Finance and Human Services Policy Committees. He also serves as an assistant majority leader, a position he has held since 2021. From 2015 to 2016, Baker was an assistant majority leader.

Opioid epidemic 
In 2011, Baker's 25-year-old son Dan died of a heroin overdose, after becoming addicted to opioids legally prescribed for an injury. In the legislature, Baker has been active in addressing the opioid epidemic. He supported legislation to require pharmacists to create accounts on a opioid prescription monitoring website set up by the state, but stopped short of mandating them to use it. He authored legislation that would impose tougher restrictions on prescribing opioids, require doctors to check patient histories, reduce the duration of prescriptions and expand safe disposal sites at pharmacies.

Baker co-authored legislation that would require doctors to check up on patients before prescribing opioid painkillers. In 2018, he authored a bill funding programs designed to curb the opioid epidemic. Baker had previously carried legislation that imposed a "penny a pill" or "stewardship fee" on manufacturers, but the provision was removed from the bill during House Republican control. 

Baker worked on the "Opioid Epidemic Response Law" with DFL State Senator Chris Eaton, who also lost a child to opioids. The legislation passed with bipartisan support and was signed by Governor Mark Dayton, but Democrats and Republicans disagreed over a provision that raised fees on companies that make opioid painkillers, which the pharmaceutical lobby aggressively fought. Eventually, lawmakers compromised and decided that the fees would be scaled back in the case of a legal settlement.

Baker was named to the Opioid Response Advisory Council by Governor Tim Walz, and later served as the council's chair. In 2021, a nationwide settlement with opioid manufacturer Johnson & Johnson included $296 million over 18 years to the state of Minnesota. The advisory council will oversee the spending of these funds. Baker called for the money to be used on addiction and opioid-related services, and was praised by Attorney General Keith Ellison for his leadership on the issue.

Other political positions 
Baker was one of two Republican House members who voted in support of legislation to restore the right of undocumented immigrants to get driver's licenses in 2019.

Baker has called for law enforcement to have more authority over fentanyl. In 2021, he voted against a bill to legalize marijuana in Minnesota, citing it as a gateway drug that could lead to the use of dangerous substances like opioids. Baker also said he opposed legalization due to an increase in the use of vaping devices, especially among youth.

COVID-19 pandemic 
Baker opposed state masking mandates, and told his employees not to ask about medical conditions or force customers to wear face masks. He criticized Governor Walz 's pandemic lockdown policy, and advocated ending all pandemic restrictions by May 2021. Baker's business received over $50,000 in Paycheck Protection Program (PPP) funds during the COVID-19 pandemic.

Electoral history

Personal life
Baker has been married to his wife, Mary, since 1985. They have three children and reside in Willmar, Minnesota.

References

External links

 Official House of Representatives website
 Official campaign website

1962 births
Living people
Republican Party members of the Minnesota House of Representatives
People from Hennepin County, Minnesota
Businesspeople from Minnesota
21st-century American politicians
People from Willmar, Minnesota